Frederick E. Nora (born 1952 in Chicago) is an American pathologist, who completed his residency at the Mayo Clinic, Rochester, and in 1983 was the first to author an original paper on bizarre parosteal osteochondromatous proliferation, also known as Nora disease.

References

1952 births
Living people
American pathologists
People from Chicago